Public Grievances Redressal is one of the flagship initiatives for the reformation in governance started by the Indian central government through addressing the grievances of general public. It was created in June 2007 by the Department of Administrative Reforms & Public Grievances. Under the public grievance mechanism any citizen of India can raise their problems, grievance or pleas to the central govt and state government Ministries and Departments. Grievances can be submitted to all important portfolio ministers and departments. The system has been designed in-house by the National Informatics Centre team. It has a telephonic feedback feature also.

Prime Minister is the supreme head of the public grievances. Jitendra Singh is currently the Minister for Independent Charge for grievances public personnel and pension Department and Sumita Dasgupta is its deputy secretary.

References

2007 establishments in Delhi
Ministry of Personnel, Public Grievances and Pensions
Customer experience
Governance